Guillermo Amparan (19 April 1905 – 29 March 1984) was a Mexican sprinter. He competed in the men's 400 metres at the 1924 Summer Olympics.

References

External links
 

1905 births
1984 deaths
Athletes (track and field) at the 1924 Summer Olympics
Mexican male sprinters
Mexican male middle-distance runners
Olympic athletes of Mexico
20th-century Mexican people